Bali Brahmbhatt is a Gujarati music director and playback singer who mainly performs Bollywood songs.

Discography

As a Playback Singer

Albums

References

Bollywood playback singers
Kenyan rappers
Year of birth missing (living people)
Living people
Musicians from Nairobi
Kenyan people of Indian descent